Gayheart is a surname. Notable people with the surname include:

 Rebecca Gayheart (born 1971), American television and film actress

See also
 Lucy Gayheart, a 1935 novel by Willa Cather

Surnames of German origin